John Edwin (10 August 1749 – 31 October 1790), English actor, was born in London, the son of a watchmaker.

Life
As a youth, he appeared in the provinces, in minor parts; and at Bath in 1768 he formed a connexion with a Mrs Walmsley, a milliner, who bore him a son, but whom he afterwards deserted. His first London appearance was at the Haymarket in 1776 as Flaw in Samuel Foote's The Cozeners, but when George Colman took over the theatre he was given better parts and became its leading actor. In 1779 he was at Covent Garden, and played there or at the Haymarket until his death.

Ascribed to him are The Last Legacy of John Edwin, 1780; Edwin's Jests and Edwin's Pills to Purge Melancholy.

References

External links

English male stage actors
1749 births
1790 deaths
18th-century English male actors